On January 25, 2012, a team of United States Navy SEALs raided a compound 12 miles north of the Somali city of Adado, killing nine Somali pirates and freeing their hostages, American Jessica Buchanan and Dane Poul Hagen Thisted.

Background
In October 2011, Jessica Buchanan and Poul Hagen Thisted, who had been working on a demining project with the Danish Refugee Council, were kidnapped by Somali pirates in Galkayo. Attempts by the Council to enlist local Somali elders and traditional leaders to assist in freeing the hostages were unsuccessful, and the pirates refused an offer of US$1.5 million ransom. With Buchanan's health declining, U.S. officials decided to launch a raid against the pirates using several different United States special operations forces, including elements of the United States Naval Special Warfare Development Group.

Raid
Early on January 25, 2012, two dozen Navy SEALs parachuted from a C-130 Hercules two miles north of the Somali town of Adado, Galguduud, where pirates were holding the hostages with the intention of ransoming them. The SEALs then traveled by foot from their drop zone, attacked the compound, and engaged the pirates, killing all nine of them. A first-hand account of the raid appears in former DEVGRU operator Justin. K Sheffield's 2020 book MOB VI: A Seal Team Six Operator's Battles in the Fight for Good Over Evil.

Aftermath

After raiding the pirates' compound and freeing the hostages, the U.S. forces returned to their base at Camp Lemonnier in Djibouti. The President of Galmudug (a state within Somalia) thanked the United States for conducting the raid. U.S. President Barack Obama congratulated Defense Secretary Leon Panetta before his 2012 State of the Union address, without publicly revealing any details at that time.

Buchanan gave her first interview about being kidnapped with 60 Minutes in May 2013; amongst her first thoughts when kidnapped were that it was too soon to die without having children and saying goodbye to her loved ones. Buchanan and her husband returned to the United States and now have a son.

See also
List of kidnappings
List of solved missing person cases

References

2012 in international relations
2012 in Somalia
2010s missing person cases
January 2012 events in Africa
Battles in 2012
Buchanan
Formerly missing people
Hostage rescue operations
Kidnapped people
Missing person cases in Somalia
Operations involving American special forces
Buchanan
Piracy in Somalia
Violent non-state actor incidents in Africa
Somali Civil War (2009–present)
Presidency of Barack Obama
Denmark–Somalia relations
Denmark–United States relations
Somalia–United States relations
Galguduud